The Bohdan Khmelnytsky Monument is a monument in Kyiv dedicated to Bohdan Khmelnytsky, the first Hetman of Zaporizhian Host. It was built in 1888 and is  It is a dominating feature of Sophia Square and one of the city's symbols.

The monument is located almost in the middle of the Sophia Square (formerly the main city's square) on the axis that unites both belltowers of the Sophia Cathedral and the St.Michael's Monastery.

Here on 23 December 1648 residents of Kyiv met Khmelnytsky leading his Cossacks' regiments by entering the city through the Golden Gates soon after the victory over Polish Army at the battle of Pyliavtsi.

History
History of creating the monument appeared in public on initiative of Mykola Kostomarov, a historian and professor of the Kyiv University in the 1840s. The assistant director of the Kyiv School District Mikhail Yuzefovich supported that idea and originally wanted to establish the monument for the 200th anniversary of the Council of Pereyaslav. The monument was supposed to be installed at the Bessarabian Square, for which the square carried the name of Bohdan Khmelnytsky in 1869–1881. However, the construction was postponed due to the Crimean War. After receiving permission from the Imperial government in 1860 on establishment of the monument there was created a committee headed by Mikhail Yuzefovich, a professor of the St.Vladimir Imperial University, the head of the Kyiv Archaeography Commission, theorist of the Omni-State movement in Ukraine. As result, the initial draft of the monument created by Mikhail Mikeshin was outright chauvinistic – the Khmelnytsky's horse was dropping a Polish szlachcic, Jewish leaseholder, and Jesuit from a cliff, in front of which a Little Russian, Red Russian, White Russian, and Great Russian were listening to the song of a blind kobzar. Basrelief of the pedestal was showing images of the Siege of Zbarazh, the Council of Pereyaslav, and the scene of entering Kyiv by the Khmelnytsky's Cossack Host.

In 1863 the establishment of the monument was postponed again due to the 1863 January Uprising. In 1868 Mikeshin who already was creating Khmelnytsky for the monument to the Millennium of Russia in Novgorod was offered to create a draft for the Kyiv's monument. In 1869 the draft was approved and in 1870 on the Russian subscription there started fundraising for the monument. However, the committee decided to cut the budget, due to the fact that the collected sum was small (only 37,000 rubles) as well as the monument was recognized as anti-Polish and anti-Semitic by the Kyiv Governor-General Prince Aleksandr Dondukov-Korsakov. As a result, the decision was made to leave only the central figure of the Hetman in the monument.

In 1877 there was created a gypsum model of the monument. In 1879 at the Saint Petersburg Baird Works was cast a statue that was materialized in metal on a Mikeshin's draft by Pius Weloński and Artemiy Ober and for which the Naval department donated 1,600 poodi (25.6 t) of scrap metal. Portrait features and details of the Khmelnytsky's clothes were recreated on consultations of Volodymyr Antonovych. 

In 1879 the statue was brought to Kyiv, however due to lack of funding for the construction of the pedestal, the works on installation of it were ceased until the mid 1880s and the statue for several years was being holdover in the courtyard of the Kyiv Government Office Building (Будинок присутніх місць). The city architect  designed a simpler pedestal and supervised its construction as well as the installation of the monument. The Kyiv Fortress administration donated for the pedestal granite blocks that were left after the construction of the Nicholas Chain Bridge over Dnieper. On 23 June 1888 there took place a grand opening and consecration of the monument.

Since 2001 the object is included in State Register of Immovable Monuments of Ukraine as the monument of national importance.

Gallery

See also
 Cossack Hetmanate
 Arch of Freedom of the Ukrainian people

References

External links
 Bohdan Khmelnytsky Monument at the Kyiv e-Encyclopedia
 Bohdan Khmelnytsky Monument at the World Digital Library.

Monuments and memorials in Kyiv
Shevchenkivskyi District, Kyiv
Sophia Square
Landmarks in Kyiv
1888 sculptures
Bronze sculptures
Equestrian statues in Ukraine
Outdoor sculptures in Ukraine
Historic sites in Ukraine
Tourist attractions in Kyiv
Volodymyrska Street
Symbols of Kyiv
Statues of monarchs
Statues of military officers